The 2003 TVS Cup (named after sponsor TVS) was a One Day International cricket tournament that was held in Bangladesh from 11 to 21 April 2003. The tournament was played by India, Bangladesh and South Africa. The final between India and South Africa was washed out twice, leaving both finalists to share the trophy.

Squads

Matches

Group stage

Final

References

International cricket competitions in 2003
International cricket competitions in Bangladesh
TVS Group